Matteo Mainardi (Bologna, late 16th century – after 1646) was an Italian economist and arithmetician.

Life 
Born in Bologna, he is known for having done the history of the bookkeeping in Italy in the 17th century, along with Antonio Maria Villavecchia, Ambrogio Lerici, Giovanni Domenico Peri, Simon Grisogono, Giovanni Antonio Moschetti, Lodovico Flori, and others. He wrote many books about bookkeeping, and a history of the origin of every church in Bologna. All of his works were reprinted in 1700 in Bologna by Longhi. His 1632 work La scrittura mercantile formatamente regolata is considered particularly relevant.

Works

References 

Italian economists
16th-century births
17th-century deaths
Writers from Bologna